Tine Thing Helseth (born 18 August 1987) is a Norwegian trumpet soloist specializing in classical repertoire.

Career 
Helseth was born in Oslo.  She started to play trumpet at the age of 7 in a  school band and studied at the Barratt Due Institute of Music from 2002 to 2009 and at the Norwegian Academy of Music from 2009 to 2011. Her teachers have included Heidi Johanessen (Norwegian National Opera Orchestra) and since 2002 Arnulf Naur Nilsen (Oslo Philharmonic Orchestra).

Helseth is the leader of an all female brass ensemble, tenThing.

In 2011, Helseth was named a "Superstar of Tomorrow" by BBC Music Magazine. The same year she signed a contract with EMI Classics.

Concert and festival performances
Helseth has performed with orchestras including the Wiener Symphoniker, Beethoven Academie, Capella Cracoviensis, The Norwegian Chamber Orchestra, Liverpool Philharmonic Orchestra, Shanghai Symphony Orchestra, Slovenian Radio Symphony Ljubljana, Oslo Camerata, Camerata Nordica, Württemberg Philharmonic, the Trondheim Soloists, Norwegian symphony orchestras, Norwegian Army bands and other brass and wind ensembles.

She has appeared at music festivals including Bergen International Festival, Kissinger Summer Festival and Usedomer Music Festival.

In 2007 Helseth performed at the Nobel Peace Prize Concert.

Helseth has also performed more than five times in the United States so far. The first time was on 13 December 2009 at the National Gallery of Art in Washington, D.C. She then performed at Carnegie Hall in New York City on 18 February 2011, and the Struthers Library Theatre in Warren, Pennsylvania on 20 February 2011. Her most recent solo performance in the United States took place on 23–25 May 2014 at Bass Performance Hall in Fort Worth, Texas.
In April 2019 she toured the US for two weeks with her all-female brass group - tenTHING and among other locations they performed at the Empire Theatre in San Antonio, Texas on 4 April 2019.

In 2012, she opened the memorial concert for the 2011 Norway attacks by playing trumpet from the roof of Oslo City Hall.

In 2013 she appeared twice in the BBC Proms, performing with tenThing at the Cadogan Hall and also at the Royal Albert Hall.

Releases 

She appears on Didrik Solli-Tangen's second single Best Kept Secret, taken from Solli-Tangen's debut album Guilty Pleasures, which was released on 3 September 2010.
In 2012, Tine released her debut album Storyteller as well as the debut album of her brass ensemble tenThing, called 10, on EMI Classics. Her newest CD TINE, a personal selection of original and transcribed works, was released on 12 March 2013.

Prizes, contests and awards
National Soloist Championship of Norway no-age-limit open class 1st Prize 2004 
International Trumpet competition "Théo Charlier" Brussels, Belgium 2nd prize 2005 
Oslo Music Teachers Foundation Prize of Honour 2005 
Yamaha Music Foundation Europe Scholarship 2006 
Eurovision Young Musicians Competition 2006 2nd place 
The Prince Eugen Culture Prize 2006
NRK Radio P2 Prize for 2006/2007 
 Luitpold Prize of the festival Kissinger Sommer, 2007
 Spellemannprisen for best newcomer, 2007
 Borletti-Buitoni Trust Fellowship, 2009

Discography
2007: Trumpet Concertos, Haydn, Albinoni, Neruda, Hummel - with Det Norske Kammerorkester
2009: Mitt Hjerte Alltid Vanker (My Heart Is Ever Present)
2011: Storyteller
2012: 10 - with tenThing
2013: Tine
2017: Never Going Back
2021: Magical Memories
2022: Seraph

References

External links

Haydn Concerto 3rd mvt on YouTube

1987 births
Living people
Norwegian classical musicians
Norwegian trumpeters
Musicians from Oslo
Eurovision Young Musicians Finalists
Spellemannprisen winners
Barratt Due Institute of Music alumni
21st-century trumpeters
21st-century women musicians
21st-century Norwegian musicians
Women trumpeters